This is a list of caffeinated alcoholic drinks with at least 9 mg caffeine — a 2005 clinical trial showed psychoactive effects in caffeine doses as low as 9 mg.

See also 

 Alcoholic drink
 Caffeinated drink
 Coca wine
 Nicotini

References 

Energy drinks

Alcoholic drinks
Alcoholic
Mixed drinks
Drug-related lists